Manfred Oggier (born 7 August 1972) is a retired Swiss football defender.

References

1972 births
Living people
Swiss men's footballers
FC Sion players
FC Lausanne-Sport players
Association football defenders
Swiss Super League players